Audrey Moore (born 19 September 1964) is an Australian swimmer. She competed in three events at the 1984 Summer Olympics. She also won a bronze medal in the 100 m backstroke at the 1982 Commonwealth Games.

References

External links
 

1964 births
Living people
Olympic swimmers of Australia
Swimmers at the 1984 Summer Olympics
Place of birth missing (living people)
Commonwealth Games medallists in swimming
Commonwealth Games bronze medallists for Australia
Swimmers at the 1982 Commonwealth Games
Australian female backstroke swimmers
20th-century Australian women
Medallists at the 1982 Commonwealth Games